The 2011 Beach Soccer Intercontinental Cup was the first edition of the new tournament, Beach Soccer Intercontinental Cup. It took place at Jumeirah Beach in Dubai, United Arab Emirates from 22 to 26 November 2011. Eight teams participated in the competition.

Participating teams

Group stage
All matches are listed as local time in Dubai, (UTC+4)

Group A

Group B

Knockout stage

Semi-finals

Third place play off

Final

Final standings

External links
Beach Soccer Worldwide

Beach Soccer Intercontinental Cup
Beach Soccer Intercontinental Cup
International association football competitions hosted by the United Arab Emirates
Intercontinental Cup
Beach Soccer Intercontinental Cup